Lloyd Opal Russell (April 10, 1913 – May 24, 1968) was an American football and baseball player and coach of football, basketball, and baseball.  He served as the head football coach at North Texas State Teachers College, now the University of North Texas, in 1942, tallying a mark of 3–5.  Russell was also the head baseball coach at Baylor University from 1940 to 1941 and again from 1958 to 1961, compiling a record of 72–58–1.

Russell played baseball for the Cleveland Indians in 1938 before starting his coaching career. He served in both the Atlantic and Pacific for the United States Navy during World War II.

Head coaching record

Basketball

Football

References

External links

 

1913 births
1968 deaths
American football quarterbacks
Baseball shortstops
Basketball coaches from Oklahoma
Baylor Bears baseball coaches
Baylor Bears baseball players
Baylor Bears football coaches
Baylor Bears football players
Cleveland Indians players
North Texas Mean Green football coaches
St. Mary's Rattlers football coaches
St. Mary's Rattlers men's basketball coaches
United States Navy personnel of World War II
People from Atoka, Oklahoma